HMS Nabberley was a Royal Navy Mobile Naval Operating Air Base (MONAB) at the Royal Australian Air Force (RAAF) base RAAF Bankstown at Bankstown, New South Wales, Australia. HMS Nabberley was also known as MONAB II and Royal Naval Air Station (RNAS) Bankstown.

History
Assembled at RNAS Ludham and Royal Navy Air Establishment Risley, Warrington, in October 1944. The duties of HMS Nabberley were changed from that of a MONAB to that of a Receipt and Dispatch Unit shortly after formation causing some administration problems. HMS Nabberley commissioned as an independent command on 18 November 1944.

 carrying an advance party of MONAB II arrived in Sydney on 1 December 1944.  The advance party arrived at RAAF Bankstown in Sydney, together with 16 crated aircraft (8 Corsair IIs and 8 Martinet TT.Is) requestioned  from the Royal Navy Aircraft Depot at Cochin, India. The aircraft were assembled with RAAF assistance and the first aircraft assembled (Corsair II JT537) was test flown on 18 January 1945.

RAAF Bankstown was officially transferred on a loan basis to Royal Navy on 27 January 1945 and stores and equipment began to arrive at the station. The base was commissioned as HMS Nabberley, RNAS Bankstown on 29 January 1945.

The personnel began assembling crated aircraft and carrying out pre-issue test flights as a Receipt and Dispatch Unit. A total of 2,500 test flights were undertaken during the operation of HMS Nabberley.

Prince Henry, Duke of Gloucester, the Governor-General of Australia, toured the facility on 1 June 1945.

HMS Nabberley, MONAB II, was paid off on 31 March 1946. The airfield returned to RAAF control.

Commanding officers
 Commander E. P. F. Atkinson, 18 November 1944

Units based at HMS Nabberley
 723 Fleet Requirements Unit (28 February–1 May 1945)
 724 Naval Air Communications Squadron
 Aircraft Erection Unit
 Aircraft Equipping & Modification Unit
 Aircraft Storage Unit
 Maintenance, Storage & Repair 3, 4, 7 & 8

Squadrons based at HMS Nabberley
 723 Naval Air Squadron (28 February–1 May 1945) (Martinet TT.I and Corsair II). Redesignated as 723 Fleet Requirements Unit.
 724 Naval Air Squadron (10 April 1945) (Expediter I and Anson I)
 1830 Naval Air Squadron  (4–24 May 1945) (Corsair II)
 1833 Naval Air Squadron  (4 May 1945 only) (Corsair II)
 'A' Flight 1701 Naval Air Squadron (24 July–7 August and 15–21 October 1945) (Sea Otter)

Aircraft carriers squadrons disembarked from/embarked to

Satellite airfields
 Nil

References

 

Military history of Sydney during World War II
Nabberley
City of Canterbury-Bankstown